Baron Ambroży Mikołaj Skarżyński of Bończa (1787–1868) was a Napoleonic officer, Chevalier de l'Empire and a Polish general. He was born in Gawłów, Masovian Voivodeship, Poland.

Biography
Ambrozy was born into a Polish aristocratic family; his father was a wealthy landowner, a castellan and a chairman of the Polish Court of Appeal and his mother Bibiana née Lanckoronska - came from one of the oldest Polish households. Ambrozy, along with his 3 other brothers, was educated initially by Monsieur Borne, a French expatriate living in Warsaw and later at a Prussian dragoon academy.

Ambrozy is best remembered for his military achievements. At the beginning of the 19th century, he was the commander of a Napoleon's Imperial Guard squadron (Polish 1st Light Cavalry Regiment of the Imperial Guard) and he led the defense of Napoleon himself during the battle of Arcis-sur-Aube. He also took part in the battles of Wagram, Somosierra and Berry-au-Bac. For his bravery at Wagram he was awarded with a title of Chevalier de l'Empire in 1811 and a hereditary rent amounting to 500 francs a year and for his achievements at Berry-au-Bac he received a hereditary title of a Baron of the French Empire in 1814, which was later confirmed by the Polish parliament in 1820.

Skarzysnki resigned from the Napoleonic army in 1815, but returned to military service in 1830, when he joined a Uhlans regiment in the November Uprising in Poland. In 1831 he was elevated to the rank of a General of the Polish Military and was awarded the highest Polish military order, Virtuti Militari for his courage during the battles of Wawer and Grochow. After the failure of the uprising in the late 1831 Ambrozy emigrated from the Duchy of Warsaw to Prussia, where he stayed until 1857. He then returned to the Duchy to settle in his estate, Orłów, where he died in 1868.

In 1818 Ambrozy married Julia Sokolowska, daughter of the starosta of Nieszawa and he received Orłów estate as a dowry, which included a vast amount of land and a large manor. He also received Suserz estate with a wooden manor from his father, Jerzy. Skarzynski had 7 children with Julia, and their son, also called Jerzy, participated later in the Greater Poland Uprising (1848).

References
Citations

Bibliography

 History of the Polish nation's uprising of 1830 and 1831 Vol 3, Richard Otto Spazier, Paris 1833
 History of the Polish military 1795-1939, Eligiusz Kozłowski i Mieczysław Wrzosek, Warsaw 1984
 Selected correspondence of Ambrozy Mikolaj Skarzynski

See also
 Uhlans
 Polish 1st Light Cavalry Regiment of the Imperial Guard
 November Uprising

1787 births
1868 deaths
Barons of Poland
Polish generals
Recipients of the Virtuti Militari
French military personnel of the Napoleonic Wars